Diadelia betschi is a species of beetle in the family Cerambycidae. It was described by Breuning in 1975.

References

Diadelia
Beetles described in 1975
Taxa named by Stephan von Breuning (entomologist)